The 2016–17 Eastern Kentucky Colonels men's basketball team represented Eastern Kentucky University during the 2016–17 NCAA Division I men's basketball season. The Colonels, led by second-year head coach Dan McHale, played their home games at McBrayer Arena within Alumni Coliseum and were members of the East Division of the Ohio Valley Conference. They finished the season 12–19, 5–11 in OVC play to finish in last place in the East Division. They failed to qualify for the Ohio Valley tournament.

Previous season
The Colonels finished the 2015–16 season 15–16, 6–10 in OVC play to finish in fifth place in the East Division. They failed to qualify for the OVC tournament.

Preseason
In a vote of Ohio Valley Conference head men's basketball coaches and sports information directors, Eastern Kentucky was picked to finish third in the East Division of the OVC.

Roster

Schedule and results

|-
!colspan=9 style=| Exhibition

|-
!colspan=9 style=| Non-conference regular season

|-
!colspan=9 style=| Ohio Valley Conference regular season

References

Eastern Kentucky Colonels men's basketball seasons
Eastern Kentucky
Eastern Kentucky
Eastern Kentucky